Johan Einar Boström (9 October 1922 – 21 September 1977) was a Swedish football referee.

Refereeing career
In 1957, Boström began officiating in the Allsvenskan, the top flight of Swedish football. In 1960, he was appointed as a FIFA referee.

In 1972, Boström was selected as a referee for UEFA Euro 1972, where he officiated the third place play-off between Belgium and Hungary.

Boström retired from refereeing in 1972.

References

External links
 Profile at worldfootball.net

1922 births
1977 deaths
People from Gävle
Swedish football referees
UEFA Euro 1972 referees
20th-century Swedish people